The High Sheriff of County Cork was the Sovereign's judicial representative in County Cork. Initially an office for lifetime, assigned by the Sovereign, the High Sheriff became an annual appointment following the Provisions of Oxford in 1258. Besides his judicial importance, the sheriff had ceremonial and administrative functions and executed High Court Writs.

The first (High) Shrievalties were established before the Norman Conquest in 1066 and date back to Saxon times. In 1908, an Order in Council made the Lord-Lieutenant the Sovereign's prime representative in a county and reduced the High Sheriff's precedence. Despite however that the office retained his responsibilities for the preservation of law and order in a county.

High Sheriffs of County Cork
1319: John FitzSimon 
1343: Nicholas de Barry 
1344: David Barry, 5th Lord Barry
1352: John  Lumbard 
1355: John Lumbard
1358: John Lumbard
1377: John Warner 
1386: Robert Thame 
1400: Robert Cogan 
1401: John Barry, 7th Lord Barry
1403–1415: John Barry, 7th Lord Barry
1433: William Barry, 8th Lord Barry
1451: William Barry, 8th Lord Barry
1461: William Barry, 8th Lord Barry
1568-1570: Sir Richard Grenville
1580: Cormack MacTeige

17th century

18th century

19th century

20th century

References

 
Cork
History of County Cork